Danial (also Romanized as Dānīāl; also known as Dāneyā and Dānīā) is a village in Kelarabad Rural District, Kelarabad District, Abbasabad County, Mazandaran Province, Iran. At the 2006 census, its population was 1,134, in 329 families.

References 

Populated places in Abbasabad County